The Social Creed originated to express Methodism's outrage over the miserable lives of the millions of workers in factories, mines, mills, tenements and company towns. It was adopted by the Methodist Episcopal Church, the first denomination in Christendom to adopt an official Social Creed. As a part of United Methodist social principles,  United Methodist congregations are encouraged to regularly reflect upon the creed and use it in worship services.

History 

Influenced by the Social Gospel movement and the Progressive politics of early-20th-century America, the Church wrote and adopted the creed in 1908.  Its primary authors were Harry F. Ward, Elbert R. Zaring, Frank Mason North, Herbert Welch, and Worth M. Tippy. It has been altered through the years, and still appears in The Book of Discipline of the United Methodist Church, following the Social Principles section.

Social Creed 

The current Social Creed as it appears in the 2008 Book of Discipline, ¶ 166.

1908 Methodist Social Creed 
The Methodist Episcopal Church stands:

See also 
Catholic social teaching
Evangelical left
General Board of Church and Society
Sermon on the Mount
Social Gospel
Social justice
The Upper Room (United Methodist Church)

References

External links 
Methodist Federation for Social Action
The United Methodist General Board of Church and Society
The Social Creed of the Churches, by Harry F. Ward

Methodism
Religion and politics
Practical theology
1908 documents
History of Methodism in the United States